The following is a list of notable film production companies from Mainland China before the communist revolution in 1949.

C
Changcheng Film Company- (Great Wall) Active in the 1920s

D
Dadi Film Company- (Great Earth), Hong Kong production company active between 1939-1940 that focused on Mandarin-language films, founded by Cai Chusheng and Situ Huimin
Datong Film Company- (Great Harmony), Major privately owned production company of the 1940s
Dazhonghua- (Great China), first major production company to emerge in post-war Hong Kong, focused on Mandarin-language films
Dazhonghua Baihe Film Company- Major production company of the 1920s, later merged into Lianhua
Diantong Film Company- Leftist film company active from 1934-1935. Only produced four films.

G
Guohua Productions- Founded in the late 1930s by former Mingxing director Zhang Shichuan, major rival of Xinhua Film Company during the "Solitary Island" period

H
Huamei Film Company- (China-America Film), early production company founded by American Benjamin Brodsky in Hong Kong. Only produced one film, Lai Man-Wai's landmark 1913 film Zhuangzi Tests His Wife.

K
Kunlun Film Company- (Mount Kunlun Pictures), Major privately owned production company in the 1940s, produced the 1949 anti-GMD film Crows and Sparrows

L
Lianhua Film Company

M
Manchukuo Film Association- One of the most controversial company under Japanese authority
China Sun Motion Picture Company, Lai Man-wai's production company, later merged into Lianhua.
Mingxing Film Company- (Star)

N
Northeast Film Studio- One of the cornerstone companies.

S
Shanghai Animation Film Studio
Shanghai Yingxi ("Shanghai Films")- Active in the 1920s, later merged into Lianhua

T
Tianyi Film Company (Unique Film Productions), predecessor of the Shaw Brothers Studio, active in the 1920s and 1930s

W
Wenhua Film Company- (Cultural China), major privately owned (by Wu Xingcai) production company of the 1940s; produced Fei Mu's Spring in a Small Town (1947)

X
Xianggong Yingye- active in the 1920s, later merged into Lianhua
Xibei Film Company
Xin Shidai Film Company- Produced Situ Humin's 1938 The Blood Spilt in the Treasure Mountain City.
Xinhua Film Company- (New China), leftist film company, active in the 1930s and 1940s

Y
Yihua Film Company- Active in the 1930s, produced Leftist films
Yiji Film Company

Z
Zhongyang Films- (Central) Minor production company, active in the 1930s

Film
Chinese film-related lists